Simone Ercoli is a former tennis player from Italy who won a bronze medal at the 1983 Mediterranean Games.

After retiring from the sport, he has been the coach of fellow countrymen Simone Bolelli and Federico Gaio, among others.

External links

References

Year of birth missing (living people)
Living people
Italian male tennis players
Mediterranean Games bronze medalists for Italy
Mediterranean Games medalists in tennis
Competitors at the 1983 Mediterranean Games
20th-century Italian people